Victoria Kokhana Kushch (also known as Toria Tal, born on May 27, 1990, Kyiv) is a Ukrainian musician.

Biography 

Born in May 27, 1990 in Kyiv in a Ukrainian family. At the age of five, she began to study music. Graduated from the Lysenko music school, the Department of Choral Conducting (class of Professor O. Tymoshenko) and later from the Department of Composition (class of Professor L. Dychko) at the Petro Tchaikovsky National Music Academy of Ukraine (Kyiv Conservatory).

Creativity

2006 - 2013 
After graduating from the conservatory, Kokhana devoted herself to working in the pop music industry. Her experience as a composer and sound producer aided her in gaining notoriety. She participated in the creation of songs and albums by various artists.

Victoria was an author for the popular "Nomer Odin" of the NuAngels, as well as an arranger for a number of its music compositions. The album became a record holder for the number of copies sold in Ukraine. The IFPI, one of the oldest music associations in Europe, honored the album with the prestigious "Gold Record" award. Two songs from this album were selected for the music collection "50 Best Songs of Ukraine,"  and the composition "Yura, I'm Sorry" was one of the top 10 most successful songs of the decade according to "Russkoye Radio Ukraine." In the early period of Victoria Kokhana's career she was well known for, "You Are One Of Those," "Yura, I'm Sorry," "I Know It's You," "Boy," "Hanky-Panky," and others. "You Are One of Those" and "Yura, I'm Sorry" became laureates of the festival "Song of the Year" in 2006 and 2007 respectively.

2014 
Victoria Kokhana actively collaborated with many popular performers from Ukraine and Russia. In 2014 Victoria wrote songs for the Ukrainian group NikitA ("Master," "Do What You Want") and acted as sound producer for the new album of Natasha Korolyova, "Magic of L." In Russia, Kokhana gained popularity after writing music for the duet song of Aleksander Marshal and Natasha Korolyova, "Depraved By You," as well as a composition for the singer Slava, "My Mature One." In 2014 two songs written by Victoria, "Depraved By You" and "My Mature One," won "Song of the Year."

2015 
In 2015, the music composition by Kokhana, written for the video "Depraved By You", was recognized as the winner in the nomination "Fashion Video" at the popular annual Fashion People Awards.  Victoria Kokhana herself was honored with this award in the nomination "Music Industry Discovery of the Year" as the best composer and sound producer. Also Victoria's single "You Know" was unanimously recognized by all Ukrainian radio stations as the most rotated hit song of 2015. In 2015 the hits of a young talented composer were again among the winners of the "Song of the Year" for the song "Your Beloved Embrace", performed by Taisia Povaliy, and the ballad "This Year Of Love", performed by Zara.

2016 
Victoria Kokhana's composition, "Your Beloved Embrace", written for Taisia Povaliy, was unanimously recognized as the winner of the music competition "Chanson of the Year", held in the State Kremlin Palace. At the "New Wave - 2016" festival, held in September in Sochi, Victoria Kokhana's song "Tea With Milk", performed by Taisia Povaliy, won the highest ratings from music critics. In December 2016, two songs written by Kokhana were recognized as laureates of the "Song of the Year": "Crazy Happiness"  (Anita Tsoy) and "Tea with Milk" (Taisia Povaliy).

2017 
In April 2017, three of Kokhana's singles were included in the list of the best songs by the pop music award "Chanson of the Year": "Tea With milk" (Taisia Povaliy), "Crazy Happiness" (Anita Tsoy) and "Gaps Of Love" (Irina Krug). The premiere of two songs composed by Kokhana took place at the music festival "New Wave - 2017": "Autumn Under The Feet On The Soles", performed by Natasha Korolyova, and "Landmark Of Love", performed by Tamara Gverdtsiteli.

These songs instantly won the love and sympathy of a large audience of one of the most popular music festivals in the country. In November 2017 the songs "Heart Is A House For Love" (Taisia Povaliy) and "Crazy Happiness" (Anita Tsoy) became winners of the "Golden Gramophone" award.

On December 2, 2017, Victoria's four songs at once became laureates of the country's oldest music festival "Song of the Year": "Not Just Love" (Anna Semenovich), "Landmark Of Love" (Tamara Gverdtsiteli), "Heart Is The House For Love" (Taisia Povaliy) and "Autumn Under The Feet On The Soles" (Natasha Korolyova). On December 13, 2017 Kokhana entered the top five composers according to the "Russian National Music Award 2017" and was nominated for the title "Composer of the Year".

2018 
In April 2018, four songs of Victoria Kokhana were recognized as laureates of the "Chanson of the Year" award. Among them were: "In The House Where My Sadness Lives" (Tatiana Bulanova), "Zinaida" (Na-na), "Autumn Under The Feet On The Soles" (Natasha Korolyova) and "Heart Is A House For Love" (Taisia Povaliy). In September, three of Victoria's compositions were performed at the "New Wave" festival in Sochi: "Happy Birthday!" (Nikolay Baskov), "Your Kiss" (Slava) and "Look Into My Eyes" (Taisia Povaliy). In November, the song "Look Into My Eyes" received the "Golden Gramophone" award. In December 2018 three songs, put to the music of Victoria, became laureates of the main music festival in Russia - "Song of the Year": "Happy Birthday" (Nikolay Baskov), "Look Into My Eyes" (Taisia Povaliy) and "Your Kiss" (Slava). On December 7, at the 4th ceremony of the Russian National Music Award, she was nominated for "Composer of the Year" with her song "Look Into My Eyes".

2019 
On March 26, 2019, by the decree of the President of Ukraine, Kokhana was granted the honorary title of "Honored Art Worker of Ukraine" for "creating highly artistic works in the field of music, as well as for activities of organization in the cultural sphere".

On April 20, 2019, three songs, composed by Kokhana, became winners of the "Chanson of the Year" award: "Search For Me Or Don't" (Irina Krug), "Landmark Of Love" (Tamara Gverdtsiteli), and "Look Into My Eyes" (Taisia Povaliy). In addition, a new composition was presented at the concert: "Let's Forbid It To Separation", performed by Tamara Gverdtsiteli and Stas Mikhaylov.

In July 2019, within the framework of the International Festival "White Nights of St. Petersburg", spectators greeted Kokhana's songs with applause: "Landmark Of Love" (Tamara Gverdtsiteli), "Let's Forbid It To Separation" (T. Gverdtsiteli and S. Mikhailov), "Your Beloved Embrace" (Taisia Povaliy)," This Year Of Love" (Zara), as well as a completely new song, "Heart To Heart", performed by Nikolay Baskov.

Kokhana is currently working on a new album.

2020
In April 2020, two music compositions by V. Kohana received the award of the newspaper Moskovsky Komsomolets — ZD AWARDS-2019: «Let's Forbid It To Separation» performed by T. Gverdtsiteli and S. Mikhailov became the best in the category «Duet of the Year», and «Heart To Heart», performed by Nikolay Baskov received a special prize as the most rotated song on the chart «Most Russian Hit».

In December 2020 Victoria Kohana was recognized as one of the best composers of the year at the Russian National Music Award, and Fabrica band with the song «Call Me, Be Brave» on music by Kohana, shortlisted for the award as the Best Pop Group in the country.

4 songs written by Victoria Kohana were performed on December 5 at the festival «Song of the Year»: «Love is immortal» performed by Nikolay Baskov, «Special words» (Taisia Povaliy), «Call Me, Be Brave» (Fabrica band) and «Only For Redheads» (Ivanushki International band).

At the moment, a new album by Victoria Kohana is being prepared for the release, which will feature songs by the composer, written in collaboration with famous poets, and among the performers of the album are the first stars of the Russian stage.

Awards
Kokhana is a winner of the "Gold Record" Award from the International Federation of the Phonographic Industry. She has also won multiple other awards including Song of the Year,  Chanson of the Year, the Golden Gramophone Award, the Russian National Music Award, and others.

State awards 
 Honored Art Worker of Ukraine (2019)

Professional awards and prizes 
 18 laureates of the song festival "Song of the Year"
 12 "Chanson of the Year" awards
 3 "Golden Gramophone" statuettes
 2 "Fashion People Award" 2015 nominations

Notable songs

Albums Kokhana acts as a producer on:

 "Apricot Dreams" (music D. Migdal, performer Natasha Korolyova);
 "Depraved By You" (music Victoria Kokhana, performers Natasha Korolyova and Aleksander Marshal)
 "My Mature One" (music Victoria Kokhana, performer Slava)
 "Your Beloved Embrace" (music Victoria Kokhana, performer Taisia Povaliy)
 "There Is No Word Like 'Me'" (music A. Pryazhnikov, performer Natasha Korolyova)
 "Formula Of Happiness" (music Sergey Revtov, performer Valeriya)
 "This Year Of Love" (music Victoria Kokhana, performer Zara)
 "Rainbow - Smile of God" (music Sergei Revtov, performer Turetsky Choir)
 "Tea with milk" (music Victoria Kokhana, performer Taisia Povaliy)
 "I'm Tired..." (music Maxim Pokrovsky, performer Natasha Korolyova)
 "A Piece of Plombier Ice-cream" (music Victoria Kokhana - A. Zubkov, performers Victor Rybin and Natalia Senchukova)
 "You Know" (music A. Ktitarev, performer Turetsky Choir)

References

1990 births
Living people
Russian poets
Russian producers
Ukrainian producers